Pan Gongkai (born 1947), is a Chinese painter, and the current president of China Central Academy of Fine Arts (CAFA) in Beijing. He was also the former president of the China Academy of Art in Hangzhou.

Life
Pan is the son of the painter Pan Tianshou. He was born in Ninghai County, Ningbo, Zhejiang Province on January 24, 1947.

Pan studied at the Middle School Attached to the Zhejiang Academy of Art, then Zhejiang Academy of Art (now China Academy of Art).

From November 1979 to November 1984 Pan was a lecturer in the Department of Chinese Painting, China Academy of Art, before becoming the head of the department in 1987. In 1992 he was a visiting professor to the United States and received an honorary doctor degree of art there. From April 1996 to May 2001 he was the president of the China Academy of Art. Pan has been the president of Central Academy of Fine Arts (CAFA) since June 2001.

References

External links
 Pan's homepage

1947 births
Living people
Artists from Ningbo
China Academy of Art alumni
Educators from Ningbo
Painters from Zhejiang
Presidents of Central Academy of Fine Arts
Academic staff of China Academy of Art